Sakuraga-ike (shimo) Dam  is an earthfill dam located in Kochi Prefecture in Japan. The dam is used for irrigation. The catchment area of the dam is 0.1 km2. The dam impounds about 2  ha of land when full and can store 90 thousand cubic meters of water. The construction of the dam was completed in 1919.

See also
List of dams in Japan

References

Dams in Kōchi Prefecture